Howella is a genus of fish in the family Howellidae, the oceanic basslets. They are found in all oceans.

Species include:
 Howella atlantica Post & Quéro, 1991 – Atlantic pelagic basslet
 Howella brodiei J. D. Ogilby, 1899 – pelagic basslet
 Howella pammelas (Heller & Snodgrass, 1903)
 Howella parini Fedoryako, 1976
 Howella sherborni (Norman, 1930) – Sherborn's pelagic basslet
 Howella zina Fedoryako, 1976

References

Howellidae
Marine fish genera
Taxa named by James Douglas Ogilby